was a Japanese scholar and lawyer.

He was active in characterising the legal systems of the Japanese state, and his writings especially focused on the Meiji Constitution.

Education
Hozumi entered University of Tokyo at the age of nineteen after studying English for six years because many professors were foreigners who lectured in their own language. In 1883 after his graduation he entered the graduate school to continue his studies of political science. In August 1884 he went to Germany to study European institutional history and constitutional law. During his stay in Germany he studied at three universities: Heidelberg, Berlin and Strasbourg. In Strasbourg he studied under Paul Laband whose influence on Hozumi was profound. Laband was the foremost German representative of the school of legal positivism. In this usage positivism means an exclusive preoccupation with positive law, the law actually promulgated by a competent lawgiver. The central concept of Laband's theory was that of the legal personality of the state. He grounded sovereignty in this legal personality above and apart from its constituent members.

Legal scholar in Japan

In 1889 Hozumi returned to Japan and gradually shifted away from legal positivism, but he did not reject his positivist heritage outright. Within a very few years after his return, attacks from the left together with issues of interpretation of the Meiji constitution led him to seek in ancestor worship and the family state concept the true source of Japan's greatness.

In his analysis of the state, Hozumi speaks of kokutai (national body/structure) and seitai (government body/structure). Hozumi defines kokutai anew. He gives kokutai a specific legal meaning without stripping it of its historical and ethical connotations. For Hozumi kokutai refers to the locus of sovereignty. Two forms of kokutai are important: monarchy and democracy. In a monarchy the locus of sovereignty lies in the monarch and in a democracy in the people.

And the form of kokutai is also important for the kind of constitution a country has. He distinguishes two kinds, the authorized constitution and the national contract constitution. Authorized constitutions are ordained by a sovereign at his own will, while national contract constitutions arise from an agreement among sovereign individuals.

The term seitai is used by Hozumi to denote the specific governmental organization under a given kokutai. An important distinction is the difference between a despotic seitai and a constitutional seitai. A despotic seitai contains all powers in an undivided form while a constitutional seitai is characterized by the division of powers.

In his view, democracy is characteristic of European kokutai, but the Japanese kokutai is monarchical and so the Meiji Constitution is an authorized constitution.

Legacy
Hozumi is the first who gives kokutai its legal meaning and links this with the family idea. His ideas about the Meiji constitution differ from the thoughts of drafter Itō Hirobumi but his writings on the constitution are written within the framework of the Meiji constitution. Hozumi died in 1912 but his ideas about the Japanese state and the Meiji constitution remained the standard interpretation till 1945.

References

 This article is based on Richard H. Minear, Japanese Tradition and Western Law: Emperor, State, and Law in the Thought of Hozumi Yatsuka

1860 births
1912 deaths
Japanese political scientists
University of Tokyo　alumni
Academic staff of the University of Tokyo
Japanese legal scholars